"Easy" is a song by American band Commodores from their fifth studio album, Commodores, released on the Motown label. Group member Lionel Richie wrote "Easy" with the intention of it becoming another crossover hit for the group given the success of a previous single, "Just to Be Close to You", which spent two weeks at number one on the US Billboard Hot Soul Singles chart (now known as the Hot R&B/Hip-Hop Songs chart) and peaked at number seven on the Billboard Hot 100 in 1976.

Released in March 1977, "Easy" reached number one on the Billboard Hot Soul Singles chart and number four on the Billboard Hot 100. The success of "Easy" paved the way for similar Lionel Richie-composed hit ballads such as "Three Times a Lady" and "Still", and also for Richie's later solo hits.

American rock band Faith No More covered the song in 1992 and released it as a single in December of that year. This version became a worldwide hit, reaching number one in Australia and becoming a top-ten hit in eight other countries. On the Billboard Hot 100, it peaked at number 58.

Content
Written by Commodores lead singer Lionel Richie, the song is a slow ballad expressing a man's feelings as a relationship ends. Rather than being depressed about the break-up, he states that he is instead "easy like Sunday morning"—something that Richie described as evocative of "small Southern towns that die at 11:30pm" on a Saturday night, such as his hometown Tuskegee, Alabama. The song is written in the key of A ♭ major and modulates up a semitone to A major.

In the bridge section, following the opening line: "I wanna be high, so high", an electronic feedback sound, which reverberates an echo, is heard. An electric guitar solo is heard in the instrumental section of the song.

The re-recorded version of the song is on Lionel Richie's album Tuskegee which features country singer Willie Nelson.

Reception
Cash Box called it "a bluesy ballad that verifies the Commodores' versatility and professionalism as all-around musicians." Record World said that "the Commodores become the latest r&b outfit to shift gears and offer a ballad – it's one of their best melodies."

Charts

Weekly charts

Year-end charts

Certifications

Faith No More version

American rock band Faith No More recorded a cover of "Easy" (renamed "I'm Easy" in Europe) during the studio sessions for Angel Dust, following its repeated performance during live shows. It was released as the final single to the album in late 1992. Faith No More's version of "Easy" closely follows the original version, but omits the second verse of the Commodores recording and features a slightly more aggressive drum sound and guitar solo. Faith No More initially played "Easy" to replace their cover of Black Sabbath's "War Pigs" that was a fixture of their concerts during this era. Faith No More wanted to break from the typical rock band mold and also aimed to spite the heavy metal fans who attended Faith No More's concerts expecting "War Pigs". Bassist Billy Gould said the version was a straightforward cover because "we like ["Easy"] in a painful kind of way. It gives us memories of our childhood". When asked about the cover, Lionel Richie himself replied that "I was actually quite flattered about the song. Yes, I loved it!"

"Easy" was originally issued on December 29, 1992, as a double A-side single with "Be Aggressive". The double A-side peaked at number three on the UK Singles Chart, becoming the band's highest-charting UK hit, and number five on the Irish Singles Chart. "Easy" also reached number one in Australia for two weeks in May 1993 and peaked within the top five on the charts of Belgium, Finland, Iceland, Ireland and Norway. In the United States, the song was Faith No More's last single to appear on the Billboard Hot 100, peaking at number 58 in April 1993. It was later included on the European version of their album Angel Dust.

Version differences
The song was released under three titles: "I'm Easy", "I'm Easy (Cooler Version)", and "Easy". The title varies depending upon the region of release or whether it was the single or part of the album Angel Dust. As a single, in most countries apart from the United States, Australia and Japan, releases had the title "I'm Easy". In the aforementioned countries, the title was simply "Easy" with the German special edition using "I'm Easy (Cooler Version)". There are at least two different mixes in circulation, all of which originate from the same studio recording of the song.

The first mix has a voice-over by Mike Patton during the first few seconds of the song: "Turn the lights out, baby. This one's for the ladies in the house". It also has fewer guitar overdubs, a slightly different bass line before the guitar solo, and more reverb on the entire track. The second version, sometimes listed as the "Cooler Version" as titled on the German special edition of the single, lacks this voice-over but features a background string-synth arrangement throughout the song as well as the "missing" guitar parts not found in the other mix. This latter version is the one used in the music video for the song.

The first version was included on all London Records releases of the single and Angel Dust apart from the German special edition, while
the second version was included on the Slash and Slash/Liberation releases of the single, on Angel Dust and on retrospective compilations release by Slash, London Records, Rhino and Liberation.

Track listings

Songs to Make Love To
The Songs to Make Love To release, which was titled "Easy" on some pressings, was the American and Canadian release of the single. Its track list, which was almost identical to the German "I'm Easy" – special edition version which replaces track three with the re-recording of "As the Worm Turns" and is similar to the standard edition versions of "I'm Easy" which had the Revolution 23 Full Moon mix of "A Small Victory" as its third and last track, is as follows:
 "Easy" – 3:10
 "Das Schutzenfest" – 3:00
 "Midnight Cowboy" (John Barry) – 4:15
 "Let's Lynch the Landlord" (Jello Biafra) – 2:56

"I'm Easy" / "Be Aggressive"
The double A-side release, "I'm Easy" / "Be Aggressive", features "Easy" and "Be Aggressive" as its first two tracks in addition to two live tracks, with the exception of one fully live version which is identical to the Free Concert in the Park bonus disc and a two-track French version. The standard track list is as follows:
 "I'm Easy" – 3:06
 "Be Aggressive" – 3:40
 "A Small Victory" (live †) – 4:49
 "We Care a Lot" (live †) – 4:02
 "Mark Bowen" (live †) – 3:15

Japanese version
The Japanese version was released separately as a seven-track EP under the name of "Easy" with the "I'm Easy" / "Be Aggressive" cover image along with six live tracks that also featured on other versions of the single; its track list was as follows:
 "Easy"
 "Easy" (live †)
 "Be Aggressive" (live †)
 "Land of Sunshine" (live ‡)
 "RV" (live ‡)
 "Kindergarten" (live †)
 "A Small Victory" (live †)

† Live in Munich, Germany, on November 9, 1992
‡ Live in Dekalb, Illinois, September 20, 1992

Charts

Weekly charts

Year-end charts

Certifications

In popular culture
Faith No More's version appeared in a 2006 commercial for Levi's Jeans and is the theme tune for the TV program Goals on Sunday.

Sky Ferreira version
American singer and songwriter Sky Ferreira released a rendition of the song for the soundtrack of the 2017 film Baby Driver, in which she plays Baby's mother. It was produced by Nigel Godrich. To promote the track, a music video directed by the film's director, Edgar Wright, was released on September 4, 2017. On September 7, 2017, the video was uploaded to the 30th Records's official VEVO account.

Other versions
Boyz II Men covered the song on their 2011 album Motown: A Journey Through Hitsville USA

Charles Givings covered the song on his 2003 album Songs for Sunset Lovers

Samples
"Easy" was sampled by the Houston-based rap group Geto Boys for the song "Six Feet Deep" from their 1993 album Till Death Do Us Part''. It was also used as a sample in Cam'ron's song "Hey Ma".

References

1977 songs
1977 singles
1992 singles
1993 singles
Commodores songs
Faith No More songs
Number-one singles in Australia
Songs written by Lionel Richie
Song recordings produced by James Anthony Carmichael
Motown singles
Slash Records singles
1970s ballads
Pop ballads
Soul ballads